Da'an Township is a township in Huanjiang Maonan Autonomous County, Guangxi, China.

Administrative division
As of 2021, the township is divided into one community and six villages: 
Da'an Community
Dingxin
Ke'ai
Caiping
Tangfang
Huanjie
Jinqiao

History
The area belonged to Si'en County during the Qing dynasty (1644–1911).

In 1933 during the Republic of China, Da'an Township was founded.

In 1950, it came under the jurisdiction of the 5th District (also known as Da'an District). In August 1958, its name was changed to Da'an People's Commune. In 1984, Da'an People's Commune was revoked and reverted to its former name of Da'an Township.

Geography
The township is situated at the southeastern of Huanjiang Maonan Autonomous County. It is surrounded by Minglun Town on the north, Luoyang Town on the west, Changmei Township on the east, and Dacai Township, Si'en Town and Yizhou District on the south.

The Dahuanjiang River flows through the township.

Economy
The economy of the township is supported primarily by agriculture and mineral resources. The region has an abundance of copper, ferrosulfur, lead, zinc, and calcite. Significant crops include rice and corn. Sugarcane is one of the important economic crops in the region.

Demographics

The 2019 census reported the township had a population of 21,805.

References

Bibliography

 

Divisions of Huanjiang Maonan Autonomous County